is a town located in Sōya Subprefecture, Hokkaido, Japan. There is a JR train station, Horonobe Station which connects Horonobe-town with other cities in Hokkaido.

The word Horonobe originates from Poro-Nup. In Ainu language, poro means large and nup mean grassland, thus meaning a large uncultivated land. At the end of September 2016, the town had an estimated population of 2,415 and a density of 4.2 persons per km2. The total area is 574.27 km2. The north 45°latitude passes through this town. Horonobe is also known for its reindeer population and wind turbines located on its beaches.

In October 2000, with the help of local government and NEDO, the Horonobe wind power generation project came into existence. Wind turbines were installed on trial-run basis along the 3.1 km coastline. Since February 2003, there are 28 turbines working in full capacity, with an individual output of 750 kW. In total its estimated that the wind turbines in Horonobe-chō generate 50 gigawatt-hours of electricity annually, and this is supplied to Hokkaido Electric Power Company for distribution. This electricity is equivalent to annual electric consumption of about 10,000 Japanese households.

Since 1998, the Japan Atomic Energy Agency started planning an underground research laboratory at Honorobe to be able to conduct tests on the suitability of sedimentary rock for use as a deep geological repository for Japan's spent nuclear fuel (a similar research facility in crystalline rock is also being constructed at Mizunami in Gifu Prefecture). Excavation began in 2003, and is scheduled for completion in 2017.   A possibility of making a geological carbon capture and storage (CCS) site is also under consideration at Honorobe.

In 2010, the town of Horonobe was transferred from Rumoi Subprefecture to Sōya Subprefecture.

Horonobe in the media or popular culture
Some speciality microbes have been discovered in the subsurface environment. These are listed below:
 Methanosarcina horonobensis
 Methanoculleus horonobensis
 Methanoculleus horonobensis genome sequences analysis.

Transportation
Horonobe is on the JR Hokkaido Sōya Main Line which runs to Wakkanai in the north and Asahikawa in the south.

The nearest airport is Wakkanai Airport, about 53 km in the north. The other nearby airports are Asahikawa Airport about 199 km to the south and Monbetsu Airport about 192 km to the south-east and New Chitose Airport about 360 km to the south.

Mascots

Horobe is a gentle and kind reindeer. He works at the local reindeer ranch. He is unveiled in 1997.
Blupy is a gentle and fluffy blue poppy that can fly. She is unveiled in 2011.

References

External links

Official Website 

Towns in Hokkaido